Vermont is a village in Fulton County, Illinois, United States. The population was 667 at the 2010 census, down from 792 at the 2000 census.

History
The village was founded in 1835 by James and Joseph Crail. A post office was established in 1837. The village was named after the state of Vermont. In the town square, there lies a historical site telling that on October 27, 1858, Abraham Lincoln had been near the area. He told the townsmen in the area with the exact quotes "Let us have faith that right makes might and in that faith let us to the end dare to do our duty as we understand it."  and "With malice toward none and with charity for all."

Geography

Demographics

As of the census of 2000, there were 792 people, 312 households, and 219 families residing in the village. The racial makeup of the village was 97.73% White, 0.25% Native American, 0.25% Asian, 0.13% from other races, and 1.64% from two or more races. Hispanic or Latino of any race were 1.01% of the population.

There were 312 households, out of which 33.0% had children under the age of 18 living with them, 57.7% were married couples living together, 7.1% had a female householder with no husband present, and 29.8% were non-families. 26.9% of all households were made up of individuals, and 14.7% had someone living alone who was 65 years of age or older.  The average household size was 2.54 and the average family size was 3.01.

In the village, the population was spread out, with 27.8% under the age of 18, 8.0% from 18 to 24, 26.4% from 25 to 44, 22.3% from 45 to 64, and 15.5% who were 65 years of age or older.  The median age was 36 years. For every 100 females, there were 107.9 males.  For every 100 females age 18 and over, there were 102.1 males.

The median income for a household in the village was $29,375, and the median income for a family was $33,646. Males had a median income of $23,036 versus $19,318 for females. The per capita income for the village was $13,333.  About 10.2% of families and 14.2% of the population were below the poverty line, including 15.5% of those under age 18 and 14.0% of those age 65 or over.

Notable people
 John Clayton Allen, congressman from Illinois
Thomas Ray Hamer, congressman from Idaho
 John Calhoun Phillips, governor of Arizona from 1929 to 1931
 Seth Weeks, classical mandolinist

References

 
Villages in Fulton County, Illinois
Villages in Illinois
1835 establishments in Illinois